"I Lie Around" is a song by Paul McCartney and Wings that was released as the B-side to the "Live and Let Die" single in 1973. The first two verses are sung by Wings guitarist Denny Laine, Paul McCartney sings the third verse.

Recording
The song was recorded in the fall of 1970 at Columbia Studios in New York, during sessions for Ram.  Early mixes had Paul McCartney singing vocals on the entire song.

Personnel

Paul McCartney - co-lead vocals, electric and acoustic guitar, bass guitar, piano, mellotron
Linda McCartney - backing vocals
Denny Laine - lead vocals, backing vocals
Denny Seiwell - drums, backing vocals
Unknown - horns

Later release
Although the song was not placed on an album when it was initially released, it was included as a bonus track on the CD release of Paul McCartney and Wings' 1973 studio album, Red Rose Speedway, when that work became available on compact disc in 1987. It was also included as a bonus track on the remastered version of Red Rose Speedway that was re-released on CD in 1993 as a part of The Paul McCartney Collection, as well as the 2018 Red Rose Speedway (Archive Collection). It was also included on The 7" Singles Box in 2022.

References

1973 singles
Paul McCartney songs
Paul McCartney and Wings songs
Apple Records singles
Song recordings produced by George Martin
Songs written by Paul McCartney
Songs written by Linda McCartney
Song recordings produced by Paul McCartney
Music published by MPL Music Publishing